The Newport 31 is an American sailboat, that was designed by Gary Mull and first built in 1987. The design is out of production.

The Newport 31 is a development of the 1968 Mull-designed Newport 30.

Production
The boat was built by Lindsay Plastics under their Capital Yachts Inc. brand in the United States, starting in 1987.

Design
The Newport 31 is a small recreational keelboat, built predominantly of fiberglass. It has a masthead sloop rig, an internally-mounted spade-type rudder and a fixed fin keel. It displaces  and carries  of ballast.

The boat has a PHRF racing average handicap of 180 with a high of 180 and low of 180.

See also
List of sailing boat types

References

Keelboats
1980s sailboat type designs
Sailing yachts
Sailboat type designs by Gary Mull
Sailboat types built by Capital Yachts